UFC 56: Full Force was a mixed martial arts event held by the Ultimate Fighting Championship on November 19, 2005. It was held at the MGM Grand Arena in Las Vegas, Nevada, broadcast live on pay-per-view in the United States, and later released on DVD.

Background
Headlining the card were the two coaches from The Ultimate Fighter 2, Rich Franklin and Matt Hughes, scheduled to defend their middleweight and welterweight titles, respectively. This event marked the first time that an Ultimate Fighter contestant, season one's Nate Quarry, would compete for a UFC championship. Two highlight reel knockouts including the devastating knockout of Nate Quarry were performed during UFC 56.

UFC 56 drew a live gate of $1,986,600, with 9,995 tickets sold. The total fighter payroll for the event was $294,000.

Results

Fighter Payouts

Matt Hughes: $110,000 ($55,000 to fight; $55,000 to win)

Jeremy Horn: $50,000 ($25,000 to fight; $25,000 to win)

Georges St-Pierre: $35,000 ($16,000 to fight; $19,000 to win)

Rich Franklin: $26,000 ($13,000 to fight; $13,000 to win)

Joe Riggs: $12,000 (Note that Riggs was fined 10% of this amount for failing to make weight)

Nate Quarry: $10,000

Sean Sherk: $10,000

Sam Hoger: $10,000 ($5,000 to fight; $5,000 to win)

Trevor Prangley: $6,000

Gabriel Gonzaga: $6,000 ($3,000 to fight; $3,000 to win)

Nick Thompson: $6,000 ($3,000 to fight; $3,000 to win)

Thiago Alves: $4,000 ($2,000 to fight; $2,000 to win)

Kevin Jordan: $3,000

Jeff Newton: $2,000

Ansar Chalangov: $2,000

Keith Wisniewski: $2,000

Total Fighter Payouts: $294,000 (average of $18,375 per fighter)

See also 
 Ultimate Fighting Championship
 List of UFC champions
 List of UFC events
 2005 in UFC

References

Sources
UFC 56: Full Force Results on Sherdog.com
"Ultimate Fighting Championship Cards" on Wrestling Information Archives
"Riggs's Failed Weigh-In Makes UFC History" by Josh Gross, Sherdog, 19 Nov. 2005, retrieved July 3, 2006
UFC 56 Fighter Salaries

Ultimate Fighting Championship events
2005 in mixed martial arts
Mixed martial arts in Las Vegas
2005 in sports in Nevada
MGM Grand Garden Arena